Aleksandr Nelidov (1838–1910) was a Russian diplomat.

Early life 
He was born in St. Petersburg. He studied law and Oriental languages in St. Petersburg University.

Career 
He entered diplomatic service in 1855. He was Secretary to the Russian embassies at Athens, Munich and Vienna.

In 1872 he became Councillor to the Russian embassy in Constantinople. He directed the diplomatic office at the headquarters of the Russian army during the Russo-Turkish War of 1877–1878. He was an active part in negotiations that led to the Peace treaty of San Stefano and later the Treaty of Berlin.

He was Ambassador to Saxony in 1879. Nelidov helped settle the Armenian question and Balkan difficulties. He was Ambassador to Italy (1897–1903) and Ambassador to France (1903–1910).

He presided over the 1907 Hague Peace Conference.

He died from apoplexy on 18 September 1910, which he contracted while passing through Munich on 8 August.

References

Out of My Past: The Memoirs of Count Kokovtsov Edited by H.H. Fisher and translated by Laura Matveev; Stanford University Press, 1935.

1835 births
1910 deaths
People from Smolensk Governorate
Diplomats of the Russian Empire
Ambassadors of the Russian Empire to Italy
Ambassadors of the Russian Empire to France
Saint Petersburg State University alumni
Burials at Nikolskoe Cemetery
Ambassadors of the Russian Empire to the Ottoman Empire